Elizabeth Hamilton Huntington, (October 8, 1878 – 1963) was a 20th-century American painter best known for her still life and floral paintings, often executed in pastel on paper.

Early life and education
Elizabeth Hamilton Thayer (later Elizabeth Hamilton Huntington) was born in South Braintree, Massachusetts in 1878. Huntington was related to the painter Abbot Thayer, via her mother, Alexander Hamilton.

She attended the Massachusetts College of the Arts in Boston where she studied under Ernest Lee Major.

Career 
During her engagement to her future husband, Raymond, Huntington was diagnosed with polio that paralyzed the right side of her body. In order to continue painting she had to manipulate her non-functional right arm using her left arm. Huntington's husband hand made a desk that could be fit to a car in order for her to paint.

Huntington's disability greatly affected her ability to take part in the art community of Boston. Huntington created a salon in her home, where people would show their art and give lectures. In 1933, this group became officially known as the Wellesley Society of Artists The WSA is still in operation today.

Huntington's work was exhibited in the late 2000s and early 2010s both at Fruitlands Museum in Harvard, Massachusetts and at the now-defunct Floria Museum for Women Artists in DeLand, Florida. Huntington's work was collected by champions of the unknown, like Samuel M. Robbins of Newton, Massachusetts.

Personal life 
Huntington married Raymond Edwards Huntington on June 9, 1909 in Wollaston, Massachusetts.

Death and legacy 
Huntington painted until her death in 1963.

Huntington left approximately 5,000 works in oil, pastel, and watercolor.

A collection of her materials is held at the Smithsonian Institution's Archives of American Art and the Peabody Essex Museum library.

Exhibitions 

 2009: The Nature of Apples, Fruitlands Museum
White Mountain Artists 1840-1940, Florida Museum for Women Artists
 New England Impressionists Rediscovered, Fruitlands Museum

Books 
Huntington's book, Water Colors by Elizabeth T. Huntington was published in Boston in 1939.

Huntington's paintings are featured in several exhibition catalogs/books, including:

 Paintings by American Women: Selections from the Collection of Louise and Alan Sellars (1989)
 Women Artists in the White Mountains, 1940-1940 (1990)
 Things of Beauty: Floral Still-Lifes: Selected from the Louise and Alan Sellars Collection of Art by American Women (1992)

References

External links 

 Elizabeth Hamilton Thayer Huntington papers, Archives of American Art, Smithsonian Institution

1878 births
1963 deaths
19th-century American painters
People from Braintree, Massachusetts
20th-century American painters
Painters from Massachusetts